Sand flea may refer to:

 Arthropoda of the class Insecta:
 Sandfly
 Chigoe flea Tunga penetrans
 Crustacea of the class Malacostraca:
 Talitridae
 Emerita (crustacean), also known as mole crab
 Culicoides furens, a biting midge known colloquially as "sand fleas", particularly in the Southeastern U.S.
Operation Sand Flea, US operations in Panama

Animal common name disambiguation pages